Saint-Privat-du-Fau is a commune in the Lozère department in southern France.

Notable people
Augustin Trébuchon (30 May 1878 – 11 November 1918) was the last French soldier killed during the First World War. He was a shepherd in Saint-Privat-du-Fau when he was mobilised in 1914.

See also
Communes of the Lozère department

References

Saintprivatdufau